The page gives a timeline of the various events related to the Quran according to traditional Islamic accounts.

Events

Muhammad
 22 December 609 CE, Muhammad recites a chapter of the Quran for the first time after angel Gabriel, according to Islamic tradition, reveals surah Al-Alaq in the Cave of Hira.
 610 CE, Muhammad receives the second revelation with surah Al-Muddaththir.
 622 CE Al-Baqarah, the first surah after the Hijrah is revealed.
 624 CE Al-Anfal is revealed mentioning the Battle of Badr.
 632 CE surah Al-Ma'ida is revealed, the last sura.

Post Muhammad
 633 CE The Qur'an was written down on the order of Abu Bakr in one book form
 earlier than 645 -In 2015 the manuscript, which is held by the University of Birmingham was radiocarbon dated to between 568 and 645 CE (in the Islamic calendar, between 56 BH and 25 AH)
 653 CE The Quran is canonized by Uthman ibn Affan
 657 CE; pages of the Quran are wrapped around swords by Muawiyahs forces during the Battle of Siffin
 661 CE - 671 CE: the estimated radiocarbon dating of one of the oldest surviving copy of the Quran, the Sanaa manuscript
 769: The first full tafsir attributed to Muqatil ibn Sulayman ibn Bashiral-Balkhi. Ma'ani al-Qur'an (The Meaning of The Qur'an) by Abu Zakaria al-Farra (207AH).
 859 CE, the oldest quranic school (madrasa) in University of al-Karaouine is built
 883 CE; the one of the oldest and big surviving tafsir collection was completed, namely Tafsir al-Tabari
 884 CE; the first complete translation of the Quran into a foreign language
 1609 CE Quranic calligraphy for the Taj Mahal is created by Abdul Haq, aka Amanat Khan
 1649 CE; the first known translation of the Quran into the English language by Alexander Ross, chaplain to King Charles I.

Some modern scientific methods discussed in "Nassourou, Mohamadou (2013), 'The Qurʾanic verses : history, computer-supported reconstruction of the order of revelation, examining the concept of abrogation', AVM - Akademische Verlagsgemeinschaft, Munich, Germany, "
have also been used to reconstruct the entire chronology of the Quranic verses.

References

Timeline
Timelines of Muslim history